Strathmore is a census-designated place (CDP) in Tulare County, California, United States. The population was 2,819 at the 2010 census, up from 2,584 at the 2000 census.

History
Strathmore was given its name by the Scottish corporation Balfour Guthrie Company in 1908. It is a Scottish word which translates to “broad valley.” Previous names for Strathmore have been Roth Spur and Santos, CA.

Geography
Strathmore is located at  (36.144891, -119.059506).

Climate
According to the Köppen Climate Classification system, Strathmore has a semi-arid climate, abbreviated "BSk" on climate maps.

Demographics

2010
At the 2010 census Strathmore had a population of 2,819. The racial makeup of Strathmore was 1,490 (52.9%) White, 12 (0.4%) African American, 41 (1.5%) Native American, 7 (0.2%) Asian, 1 (0.0%) Pacific Islander, 1,162 (41.2%) from other races, and 106 (3.8%) from two or more races. Hispanic or Latino of any race were 2,238 persons (79.4%).

The whole population lived in households, no one lived in non-institutionalized group quarters and no one was institutionalized.

There were 705 households, 422 (59.9%) had children under the age of 18 living in them, 411 (58.3%) were opposite-sex married couples living together, 130 (18.4%) had a female householder with no husband present, 54 (7.7%) had a male householder with no wife present.  There were 51 (7.2%) unmarried opposite-sex partnerships, and 4 (0.6%) same-sex married couples or partnerships. 93 households (13.2%) were one person and 40 (5.7%) had someone living alone who was 65 or older. The average household size was 4.00.  There were 595 families (84.4% of households); the average family size was 4.35.

The age distribution was 1,051 people (37.3%) under the age of 18, 340 people (12.1%) aged 18 to 24, 696 people (24.7%) aged 25 to 44, 531 people (18.8%) aged 45 to 64, and 201 people (7.1%) who were 65 or older.  The median age was 25.5 years. For every 100 females, there were 99.6 males.  For every 100 females age 18 and over, there were 101.1 males.

There were 751 housing units at an average density of 529.1 per square mile, of the occupied units 366 (51.9%) were owner-occupied and 339 (48.1%) were rented. The homeowner vacancy rate was 1.9%; the rental vacancy rate was 6.4%.  1,475 people (52.3% of the population) lived in owner-occupied housing units and 1,344 people (47.7%) lived in rental housing units.

2000
At the 2000 census there were 2,584 people, 678 households, and 551 families in the CDP. The racial makeup of the CDP was 45.47% White, 0.23% African American, 1.08% Native American, 1.39% Asian, 47.64% from other races, and 4.18% from two or more races. Hispanic or Latino of any race were 68.54%.

Of the 678 households 51.2% had children under the age of 18 living with them, 60.2% were married couples living together, 15.9% had a female householder with no husband present, and 18.7% were non-families. 15.9% of households were one person and 8.7% were one person aged 65 or older.  The average household size was 3.81 and the average family size was 4.25.

The age distribution was 38.5% under the age of 18, 12.6% from 18 to 24, 26.0% from 25 to 44, 15.9% from 45 to 64, and 6.9% 65 or older.  The median age was 24 years. For every 100 females, there were 102.0 males.  For every 100 females age 18 and over, there were 98.3 males.

The median household income was $25,156 and the median family income  was $27,917. Males had a median income of $22,188 versus $19,542 for females. The per capita income for the CDP was $8,128.  About 24.2% of families and 30.4% of the population were below the poverty line, including 41.3% of those under age 18 and 21.5% of those age 65 or over.

Politics
In the state legislature Strathmore is located in the 18th Senate District, represented by Republican Roy Ashburn, and in the 34th Assembly District, represented by Republican Bill Maze.

In the United States House of Representatives, Strathmore is in

References

Census-designated places in Tulare County, California
Census-designated places in California